Night Gallery is an American anthology television series that aired on NBC from December 16, 1970, to May 27, 1973, featuring stories of horror and the macabre. Rod Serling, who had gained fame from an earlier series, The Twilight Zone, served both as the on-air host of Night Gallery and as a major contributor of scripts, although he did not have the same control of content and tone as he had on The Twilight Zone. Serling viewed Night Gallery as a logical extension of The Twilight Zone, but while both series shared an interest in thought-provoking dark fantasy, more of Zones offerings were science fiction while Night Gallery focused on horrors of the supernatural.

Format

Serling appeared in an art gallery setting as the curator and introduced the macabre tales that made up each episode by unveiling paintings (by artists Thomas J. Wright and Jaroslav "Jerry" Gebr) that depicted the stories. His intro usually was, “Good evening, and welcome to a private showing of three paintings, displayed here for the first time. Each is a collector’s item in its own way—not because of any special artistic quality, but because each captures on a canvas, suspended in time and space, a frozen moment of a nightmare.”
Night Gallery regularly presented adaptations of classic fantasy tales by authors such as H. P. Lovecraft, as well as original works, many of which were by Serling himself.

During its second season, the series also began using original comic blackout sketches between the longer story segments in some episodes. Rod Serling vehemently opposed their presence on the show, and as such, several of them have no introduction from Serling. He stated "I thought they [the blackout sketches] distorted the thread of what we were trying to do on Night Gallery. I don't think one can show Edgar Allan Poe and then come back with Flip Wilson for 34 seconds. I just don't think they fit." These types of segments were much less frequent in the third and final season.

The series was introduced with a pilot television film consisting of three segments or movies, that aired on November 8, 1969, and featured the directorial debut, the second segment, of Steven Spielberg, as well as one of the last acting performances by Joan Crawford.

Night Gallery was initially part of a rotating anthology or wheel series called Four in One. This 1970–1971 television series rotated four separate shows, including McCloud, SFX (San Francisco International Airport) and The Psychiatrist. Two of these, Night Gallery and McCloud, were renewed for the 1971–1972 season, with McCloud becoming the most popular and longest running of the four.

Music
The show featured various composers. The original pilot theme and background music was composed by Billy Goldenberg. The theme for the first two seasons, composed by Gil Mellé, is noted for being one of the first television openings to use electronic instruments. For the third season, Mellé's theme was replaced with a more frantic orchestral piece by Eddie Sauter. Currently, no music from the show has been released commercially.

Production
Serling wrote many of the teleplays, including "Camera Obscura" (based on a short story by Basil Copper), "The Caterpillar" (based on a short story by Oscar Cook), "Class of '99", "Cool Air" (based on a short story by H.P. Lovecraft), "The Doll", "Green Fingers", "Lindemann's Catch", and "The Messiah on Mott Street" (heavily influenced by Bernard Malamud's "Angel Levine"). Non-Serling efforts include "The Dead Man", "I'll Never Leave You—Ever", "Pickman's Model" (based on a short story by H.P. Lovecraft), "A Question of Fear", "Silent Snow, Secret Snow", and "The Sins of the Fathers".

Robert Bloch wrote two teleplays for the show. "Logoda's Heads" was based on the story by August Derleth. "Last Rites for a Dead Druid" originally was an adaptation by Bloch of the H.P. Lovecraft/Hazel Heald collaboration "Out of the Aeons"; however, Bloch's script was not used, and the episode was rewritten and retitled, with "Last Rites for a Dead Druid" bearing no resemblance to "Out of the Aeons".

Episodes

Award nominations
Night Gallery was nominated for an Emmy Award for its first-season episode "They're Tearing Down Tim Riley's Bar" as the Outstanding Single Program on U.S. television in 1971. In 1972, the series received another nomination (Outstanding Achievement in Makeup) for the second-season episode "Pickman's Model". Serling himself received an Edgar Allan Poe Award for writing the pilot.

Syndication
In order to increase the number of episodes that were available for syndication, the 60-minute episodes were re-edited for a 30-minute time slot, with many segments severely cut, and others extended by inserting "new" scenes of recycled, previously discarded, or stock footage to fill up the time. In their book Rod Serling's Night Gallery: An After-Hours Tour, authors Scott Skelton and Jim Benson identify 39 of the 98 individual segments that were produced for Night Gallery as being "severely altered" in syndication. Twenty-five episodes of an unrelated, short-lived supernatural series from 1972, The Sixth Sense, were also incorporated into the syndicated version of the series, with Serling providing newly filmed introductions to those episodes. As The Sixth Sense was originally a one-hour show, these episodes were all severely edited to fit into the half-hour timeslot.

The original, uncut and un-edited hour-long  version of the series (and without the additional Sixth Sense episodes) has been shown on STARZ!’s Encore Mystery premium movie cable network. The show has aired in the 30-minute format in some markets through the Retro Television Network in the past.

MeTV had broadcast rights for Night Gallery and aired the show in its edited, 30-minute format, including the edited The Sixth Sense episodes.

From May 21 to May 23, 2016, Decades aired a marathon of the series.

On December 6, 2018, Syfy announced that it plans to revive the Night Gallery series.

On April 6, 2020, Comet TV began airing the show.

Home media

Universal Studios has released all 3 seasons on DVD in Region 1 as well as the first season on DVD in the UK.

On September 12, 2017, Universal released Night Gallery: The Complete Series on DVD in Region 1.

See also
Similar series

 Alcoa Presents: One Step Beyond
 Alfred Hitchcock Presents
 Amazing Stories
 Creepshow
 Darkroom
 Fear Itself
 Masters of Horror
 Masters of Science Fiction
 Monsters
 Night Visions
 Science Fiction Theatre
 Tales from the Crypt
 Tales from the Darkside
 Tales of Tomorrow
 The Outer Limits
 The Ray Bradbury Theater
 The Twilight Zone
 Treehouse of Horror IV
 Twilight Zone franchise
 Thriller
 Way Out

References

External links
 
 Rod Serling's Night Gallery: A Shadowy Museum of the Outre

1970 American television series debuts
1970s American anthology television series
1970s American comedy-drama television series
1970s American mystery television series
1970s American science fiction television series
1973 American television series endings
American fantasy drama television series
American fantasy television series
American horror fiction television series
American thriller television series
English-language television shows
NBC original programming
Television series by Universal Television
Television series created by Rod Serling